Macnaughtan is a Scottish surname. Notable people with the surname include:

Alan MacNaughtan (1920–2002), Scottish actor
Andrew MacNaughtan (1964–2012), Canadian photographer and music video director
Sarah Broom Macnaughtan (1864–1916), Scottish-born novelist

See also
 Macnaghten (disambiguation)
 McNaughton, a surname

Anglicised Scottish Gaelic-language surnames